Jorge Luis Alcalá (born July 28, 1995) is a Dominican professional baseball pitcher for the Minnesota Twins of Major League Baseball (MLB).

Career

Houston Astros
Alcalá signed with the Houston Astros as an international free agent in December 2014. He made his professional debut in 2015 with the Dominican Summer League Astros, going 2–0 with a 3.06 ERA in 32.1 innings pitched. He played 2016 with the Gulf Coast Astros, Greeneville Astros and Tri-City ValleyCats, pitching to a combined 3–3 record with a 2.41 ERA in 15 games (ten starts) between the three teams. He played 2017 with the Quad Cities River Bandits and Buies Creek Astros, compiling a 7–6 record with a 3.05 ERA in 22 games (18 starts), and started 2018 with Buies Creek before being promoted to the Corpus Christi Hooks.

Minnesota Twins
On July 27, 2018, Alcalá and Gilberto Celestino were traded to the Minnesota Twins in exchange for Ryan Pressly. He was assigned to the Chattanooga Lookouts. In 24 games (16 starts) between Buies Creek, Corpus Christi, and Chattanooga, he pitched to a 3–11 record with a 3.81 ERA and a 1.34 WHIP. He split the 2019 minor league season between the Pensacola Blue Wahoos and the Rochester Red Wings, combining to go 6–7 with a 5.47 ERA over 109 innings.

On September 14, 2019, the Twins selected Alcalá's contract and promoted him to the major leagues. He made his major league debut on September 21 versus the Kansas City Royals, pitching  of an inning.

With the 2020 Minnesota Twins, Alcalá appeared in 16 games, compiling a 2–1 record with 2.63 ERA and 27 strikeouts in 24.0 innings pitched.

In 2021, Alcalá appeared in 59 games for the Twins. He ended the year with a 3–6 record, a 3.92 ERA, and 61 strikeouts across 59.2 innings.

Alcalá only appeared in 2 games during the 2022 season. Unfortunately, elbow inflammation essentially wiped out his entire season, as he was placed on the injured list 5 games into the year, before being shut down for the season in August. He pitched 2.1 innings, striking out 2 while walking 2 other batters.

On January 13, 2023, Alcalá agreed to a one-year, $790K contract with the Twins, avoiding salary arbitration.

References

External links

1995 births
Living people
People from Bajos de Haina
Dominican Republic expatriate baseball players in the United States
Major League Baseball players from the Dominican Republic
Major League Baseball pitchers
Minnesota Twins players
Dominican Summer League Astros players
Gulf Coast Astros players
Greeneville Astros players
Tri-City ValleyCats players
Quad Cities River Bandits players
Buies Creek Astros players
Corpus Christi Hooks players
Chattanooga Lookouts players
Pensacola Blue Wahoos players
Rochester Red Wings players
Fort Myers Mighty Mussels players